The Loch of Harray is the largest loch of Mainland Orkney, Scotland and is named for the parish of Harray. It lies immediately north of the Loch of Stenness and is close  to the World Heritage neolithic sites of the Stones of Stenness and Ring of Brodgar. In Old Norse its name was Heraðvatn.

Hydrology
The loch was surveyed on 21 August 1903 by Sir John Murray and later charted  as part of the Bathymetrical Survey of Fresh-Water Lochs of Scotland 1897-1909. The loch is connected to the Loch of Stenness at the Bridge of Brodgar. The two lochs together cover an area of  making the two combined the ninth largest loch in Scotland by area (as listed by Murray and Pullar (1910)). Murray recorded that despite there being an inlet allowing the free flow of water from the Loch of Stenness it has little impact on the biology of Harray and no seaweed was present, the water tasted fresh and normal freshwater plankton were seen.

Natural history
The loch is a Site of Special Scientific Interest and has a large number of pondweed species three of which are scarce, a rare caddis fly (Ylodes reuteri) and is the only known site in Scotland for a nerite snail Theodoxus fluviatilis which is more commonly found in English rivers. A wide variety of wildfowl winter at the loch including pochard, tufted duck, scaup and goldeneye.

References

Harray
Harray
Sites of Special Scientific Interest in Orkney
World Heritage Sites in Scotland
Harray
Mainland, Orkney